Nalin Nilantha Bandara Wijerathna Jayamaha Hitihamilage (born 5 June 1974) is a Sri Lankan politician and current member of parliament for Kurunegala District, he is also member of the United National Party.

References 

Samagi Jana Balawegaya politicians
United National Party politicians
1974 births
Living people
Members of the 16th Parliament of Sri Lanka